Anthurium balslevii is a species of plant in the family Araceae. It is endemic to Ecuador.  Its natural habitat is subtropical or tropical moist lowland forests. It is threatened by habitat loss.

References

Endemic flora of Ecuador
balslevii
Vulnerable plants
Taxonomy articles created by Polbot